The 1924 Haskell Indians football team was an American football team that represented the Haskell Institute (later renamed Haskell Indian Nations University) as an independent during the 1924 college football season.  In its third season under head coach Dick Hanley, the team compiled a 7–2–1 record and outscored opponents by a total of 219 to 70.

Three Haskell players were selected by Leslie Edmonds of the Topeka Capital as first-team players on his 1924 All-Kansas football team: John Levi at fullback and Theodore "Tiny" Roebuck and Jack Norton, aka Charging Skunk, at the guard positions. In addition, George Levi was selected to the second team at the halfback position. John Levi was described as "the greatest Indian football players since the days of Jim Thorpe."

Schedule

References

Haskell
Haskell Indian Nations Fighting Indians football seasons
Haskell Indians football